Đani Salčin (born 19 March 2000) is a Bosnian professional footballer who plays for Bosnian Premier League club Sarajevo and the Bosnia and Herzegovina U21 national team.

Honours
Sarajevo
Bosnian Premier League: 2018–19, 2019–20
Bosnian Cup: 2018–19, 2020–21

Velež Mostar
 Bosnian Cup: 2021–22

References

External links

2000 births
Living people
Sportspeople from Mostar
Bosnia and Herzegovina footballers
Bosnia and Herzegovina youth international footballers
Bosnia and Herzegovina under-21 international footballers
Association football midfielders
Association football defenders
Premier League of Bosnia and Herzegovina players
FK Sarajevo players
FK Velež Mostar players